The Ireland national handball team is controlled by the Irish Olympic Handball Association (IOHA) and represents Ireland in international handball matches.

History

Liverpool Airport 4-Nations Championship 1984
In 1984 the team played a 4-Nations Championship in Liverpool. They lost the first game against England 1 to 12, the game against Scotland was lost by 5 to 20 and the final game against Wales they lost 14 to 16. They finished last place in the tournament.

EHF Challenge Trophy 2009
The Irish Men's team finished in 3rd place of the group G2 in the EHF Challenge Cup trophy in Malta. 3rd place is the best result an Irish team have achieved in the 10 years of the competition.

The schedule for the tournament resulted in Ireland playing the hosts Malta in the first match at the University Sports Hall. In front of a home Maltese crowd, the Irish were down at half time by 20:7. Ireland in the second ended up being beaten by a 36 to 20 score line. The game was marred by a challenge on Sligo's Brian Campion following a foul by a Maltese player, with the Maltese player receiving a straight red card.
 
The second game of the tournament for the Irish saw them taking on the favorites/favorites and eventual winners Finland. The Finns won comfortably by 38 goals to 19. Brian Campion recovered from the previous day's incident to take his place in the team.
 
Ireland's third game was against Scotland. The Scottish team, which had 4 players from the Great Britain Olympic Program, led 15:14 at half time.  The Irish ultimately won by 35:29.
 
The Bronze medal was not the only award the Irish won at the Tournament. Middle Back player Oisin O' Brannagain was voted on to the tournament's all star team.

EHF Challenge Trophy 2011
The most recent Irish international games took place at the University of Limerick for the 2011 edition of the EHF Challenge Trophy.

The first game with eventual champions, the Faroe Islands, ended in a 30–20 defeat with Kevin Murphy's 5 goals top scoring for the Irish and Alim Khaliq receiving man of the match in goal.

The second match with Georgia was a similar story, the Irish losing 37–21. Chris O'Reilly top scored with 6 and Steffan Meyer's 4 goals helping him claim the man of the match for the Ireland.

The final game was against England, and Ireland took a 15–11 lead in the first half. However, the game ended 29–24 to England. The scoring in this game came mainly from the back court, with O'Reilly once again top scoring with 11 goals and Meyer adding 5. Both players were named in the All-Star team for the tournament.

The team competed in the 2014 European qualifiers for the first time in June 2012. All three matches, however, resulted in huge losses.

IHF Emerging Nations Championship record
2015 – 13th place
2017 – 12th place
2019 – 11th place

External links
Official website
IHF profile

References

Men's national handball teams
Handball
Handball in Ireland